The Federation of Information and Communication Technology Service Workers of Japan (ICTJ) is a trade union representing IT and telecommunications workers in Japan.

The union was established in 1962 as the All-Japan Telecommunication Workers' Union.  It affiliated to the General Council of Trade Unions of Japan, and by 1967, it had 226,685 members.  In 1978, it joined the Postal, Telegraph and Telephone International.  At the end of the 1980s, it joined the Japanese Trade Union Confederation, of which its president, Akira Yamagishi, became the first leader.  In 1991, it became the ICTJ, and by 2009, its membership was 220,730.  By 2020, its membership had fallen to 199,135.

External links

References

Communications trade unions
Trade unions established in 1962
Trade unions in Japan